Barahona may refer to:

Places

Dominican Republic 
Barahona Province
Barahona, Dominican Republic or Santa Cruz de Barahona, capital of the province above
Port of Barahona
Roman Catholic Diocese of Barahona
Barahona Men (volleyball club)

Guatemala 
Santa Catarina Barahona, a municipality in the department of Sacatepéquez

Puerto Rico 
Barahona, Morovis, Puerto Rico, a barrio

People
Belisario Porras Barahona (1856–1942), Panamanian journalist and politician
Carlos Barahona (born 1980), Colombian football player
Juan de Esquivel Barahona (c. 1560–after 1625), Spanish composer
Luis Barahona de Soto (1548–1595), Spanish poet
Luis Marín Barahona (born 1983), Chilean football player
Mario Alexander Barahona Martínez (born 1976), Honduran politician
Martín Barahona, El Salvador Anglican bishop
Miguel Paz Barahona (1863–1937), Honduran president
Nacho Barahona, Spanish film editor
Nelson Barahona (born 1987), Panamanian football player 
Noelle Barahona (born 1990), Chilean skier
Ralph Barahona (born 1965), American ice hockey player 
Wilfredo Barahona (born 1983), Honduran footballer

See also 
Baraona